Lyon Gardiner Tyler Sr. (August 24, 1853 – February 12, 1935) was an American educator, genealogist, and historian. He was a son of John Tyler, the tenth president of the United States. Tyler was the 17th president of the College of William & Mary, an advocate of historical research and preservation, and a prominent critic of U.S. President Abraham Lincoln.

Early life and education

Tyler was the fourth son of President John Tyler and First Lady Julia Gardiner Tyler, and was born at his father's Sherwood Forest Plantation in Charles City County. The former president, a prominent slaveholder and secessionist, died in January 1862, when Lyon was eight years old. Since the American Civil War had begun, Union troops would occupy the plantation several months later during the Peninsular Campaign, as well as during the Overland Campaign of 1864.

Meanwhile, Julia Tyler moved with her children north to Staten Island, where she had relatives. Tyler returned to Virginia in 1869 to complete his studies at the University of Virginia in Charlottesville. He earned both a bachelor's degree and a master's degree in law from the University of Virginia, and graduated in 1875. While at the university he was a member of Kappa Sigma and the Jefferson Literary Society, and contributed to the school's literary magazine.

Early teaching, legal and political careers
After graduation, Tyler spent a year teaching philosophy and literature at the College of William & Mary, near his family's Sherwood Forest plantation (his father had served as the institution's 15th President during this John's infancy). Since the college was struggling financially, it stopped paying his salary. Tyler then resigned and moved to Memphis, Tennessee, where he spent several years as principal of a private school.

In 1882 Tyler returned to Virginia to practice law in Richmond, where his mother had moved. With his mother's support, Tyler he began work on The Letters and Times of the Tylers, a three-volume study of the careers of his father and paternal grandfather, John Tyler Sr. This would be published between 1884 and 1896.

Tyler also advocated reforming public education during his time in Richmond. He helped revive the Virginia Mechanics Institute, both as a board member and as an instructor. In 1887 Richmond voters elected Tyler as one of their four representatives in the Virginia House of Delegates, where he served alongside A.S. Buford, Henry L. Carter and John A. Curtis. That session, Tyler's advocacy led legislators to approve $10,000 to restore the 
College of William and Mary, which had received no funding for several years and had not yet recovered from a Civil War battle (Battle of Williamsburg) and later neglect. When Virginia's governor signed the appropriation into law, the college reopened in 1888, and its trustees named Tyler its president.

President of the College of William and Mary
From 1888 to 1919, Tyler served as the 17th president of the College of William & Mary (W&M). He restored the college's finances following the deterioration which took place in and following the Civil War. During his tenure, Tyler was also chairman of the history department, and with six other professors formed the body known as the "Seven Wise Men". He also started the William and Mary Quarterly journal. Tyler also advocated women's suffrage and oversaw the college when it admitted women in 1918.

While at William & Mary, Tyler became interested in the history of Virginia. He researched throughout the state, and campaigned for the preservation of local records. In 1896 he persuaded the Virginia General Assembly to appropriate $5,000 to copy 17th-century court records, which set a precedent for spending public monies to preserve state records. Preservation became his mission in later years, and he traveled extensively throughout the Commonwealth to find material. In 1915 he was appointed to the State Library Board and would serve until his death. He was a member of the Virginia Historical Society for fifty-two years, including forty-seven years on its executive committee and thirty-two as a vice president. A prolific author, his work spurred recognition of the significance of both Jamestown and Williamsburg to American history. As discussed below, Tyler also attempted to rehabilitate his father's political reputation.

Criticism of President Lincoln and retirement
Tyler received notoriety late in life for criticizing President Abraham Lincoln on numerous occasions. The first came in 1917 in response to an editorial in The New York Times, The Hohenzollerns and the Slave Power, which analogized Southern slaveholders to the German aristocrats then engaging Europe in what became known as World War I. Tyler wrote that Lincoln more closely resembled the Prussian nobility because he was opposed to the rights of self-determination of the Confederate states, in the same way that Germany was opposed to the rights of various smaller nations of Europe.

Tyler resigned as president of William and Mary in June 1919. During his tenure the college's enrollment increased to over 200 students. The number of faculty members had grown to fourteen, and twelve buildings were either renovated or constructed. The school also became a public institution, an effort Tyler had spearheaded. He retired to his farm, Lion's Den, in Charles City County but remained active as a writer, speaker, and researcher.

In 1928, when the Virginia House of Delegates chose to adjourn in honor of Lincoln's birthday, Tyler contended that Lincoln was no hero and did not merit the honor. When Time fired back that Lincoln dwarfed Tyler's father both in stature and in accomplishments, Tyler retorted with a pamphlet claiming that Lincoln was the dwarf. In retirement, he continued the crusade against Lincoln, publishing many articles in his own journal, Tyler's Quarterly and Genealogical Magazine, that were highly critical of the sixteenth president.

In one of his last publications, a short pamphlet titled A Confederate Catechism, Tyler wrote: "Both from the standpoint of the Constitution and sound statesmanship, it was not slavery, but the vindictive, intemperate anti-slavery movement that was at the bottom of all the troubles." The Sons of Confederate Veterans and the United Daughters of the Confederacy reprinted it and recommended children recite it.

Personal life
Tyler married twice. His first wife was Anne Baker Tucker of Albemarle County, with whom he had three children: John Tyler; Elizabeth Gilmer Tyler; and Julia Gardiner Tyler Wilson, one of the founders of Kappa Delta.

Following Anne's death in 1921, Tyler married Sue Ruffin, who was 35 years his junior, They had three more children: Lyon Gardiner Tyler Jr. (1925–2020); Harrison Ruffin Tyler (born 1928); and Henry Tyler, who died in infancy. In late August 2018, Lyon Jr. participated in a reunion of presidential descendants hosted by the White House Historical Association, and signed, along with other presidential descendants, a drawer from a copy of the Resolute Desk.

Major works

Tyler's major works include:
The Letters and Times of the Tylers (three volumes, 1884–1896)
Parties and Patronage in the United States (1891)
The Cradle of the Republic: Jamestown and the James River (1900)
England in America (1904)
Williamsburg, the Old Colonial Capital (1907)
Men of Mark in Virginia (1906–1909)
Encyclopedia of Virginia Biography (1915)
History of Virginia from 1763 to 1861 (1924)
A Confederate Catechism (1929)

Death and legacy
Tyler died of pneumonia on February 12, 1935 in Richmond, where he is buried at Hollywood Cemetery. His childhood home in Charles City County, Sherwood Forest Plantation, was designated a National Historic Landmark in 1961 and placed on the National Register of Historic Places in 1966. Although still owned and occupied by descendants of the Tyler family, tours of the plantation are offered.

At the College of William & Mary, the Special Collections Research Center houses:
 Lyon Gardiner Tyler Sr.'s personal papers
 Papers as president of the College of William & Mary

The College of William & Mary also offers a Lyon Tyler Grant in History for undergraduate majors.
Other memorials to Tyler on the William and Mary campus include:
 the Tyler Family Garden, dedicated to Tyler as well as his father and paternal grandfather, both of whom were alumni of the college; located next to James Blair Hall, which houses the university's history department, the garden contains busts of the three men, and was dedicated on April 30, 2004. It was funded as part of a $5 million gift from Lyon's son, Harrison Ruffin Tyler, and his wife
 The Lyon Gardiner Tyler Department of History

See also
Seven Society (College of William & Mary)
List of oldest fathers

References

External links

 
 
Russell Smith's Lyon G. Tyler and the Quest for a Dissertation
Lyon G. Tyler Department of History at the College of William and Mary
Finding aid for the Office of the President. Lyon Gardiner Tyler Records
Finding aid for the Tyler Family Papers, Group B

1853 births
1935 deaths
Lyon Gardiner Tyler
Gardiner family
Children of presidents of the United States
Children of vice presidents of the United States
University of Virginia School of Law alumni
19th-century American historians
20th-century American historians
19th-century American educators
20th-century American educators
19th-century American politicians
American male non-fiction writers
19th-century American male writers
20th-century American male writers
American people of English descent
American people of Dutch descent
American people of Scottish descent
Members of the Virginia House of Delegates
Politicians from Richmond, Virginia
Presidents of the College of William & Mary
College of William & Mary faculty
People from Charles City County, Virginia
Burials at Hollywood Cemetery (Richmond, Virginia)
Deaths from pneumonia in Virginia
Historians from Virginia
American genealogists